Sadeqabad, Sadiqabad, or Sadiq Abad may refer to the following places:

Iran

Chaharmahal and Bakhtiari Province
Sadeqabad, Chaharmahal and Bakhtiari, a village in Shahrekord County

Fars Province
Sadeqabad, Bavanat, a village in Bavanat County
Sadeqabad, Fasa, a village in Fasa County
Sadeqabad, Now Bandegan, a village in Fasa County
Sadeqabad, Jahrom, a village in Jahrom County
Sadeqabad, Kharameh, a village in Kharameh County
Sadeqabad, Rizab, a village in Neyriz County
Sadeqabad, Sepidan, a village in Sepidan County

Golestan Province
Sadeqabad, Golestan

Hamadan Province
Sadeqabad, Hamadan, a village in Asadabad County
Sadeqabad-e Qapanuri, a village in Nahavand County

Isfahan Province
Sadeqabad, Falavarjan, a village in Falavarjan County
Sadeqabad, Isfahan, a village in Isfahan County
Sadeqabad, Lenjan, a village in Lenjan County
Sadeqabad, Bagh-e Bahadoran, a village in Lenjan County
Sadeqabad, Semirom, a village in Semirom County

Kermanshah Province
Sadeqabad, Kermanshah, a village in Ravansar County

Khuzestan Province
Sadeqabad-e Sagbu, a village in Andika County

Kurdistan Province
Sadeqabad, Bijar, a village in Bijar County
Sadeqabad, Dehgolan, a village in Dehgolan County
Sadeqabad, Divandarreh, a village in Divandarreh County

Lorestan Province
Sadeqabad, Lorestan

Markazi Province
Sadeqabad, Markazi, a village in Shazand County

Mazandaran Province
Sadeqabad, Mazandaran, a village in Tonekabon County

North Khorasan Province
Sadeqabad, North Khorasan, a village in Jajrom County

Qazvin Province
Sadeqabad, Buin Zahra
Sadeqabad, Takestan

Razavi Khorasan Province
Sadeqabad, Razavi Khorasan

Sistan and Baluchestan Province
Sadeqabad, Sistan and Baluchestan

South Khorasan Province

Tehran Province
Sadeqabad, Tehran, a village in Rey County

West Azerbaijan Province
Sadeqabad, West Azerbaijan, a village in Oshnavieh County

Yazd Province
Sadeqabad, Abarkuh, a village in Abarkuh County
Sadeqabad, Bafq, a village in Bafq County
Sadeqabad, Dehshir, a village in Taft County
Sadeqabad, Pishkuh, a village in Taft County

Pakistan
Sadiq Abad, FATA
Sadiqabad, Punjab
Sadiqabad Tehsil